State Road 47 is an IB-class road in northern Serbia, connecting the Bogoslovija neighborhood of Belgrade with a printing company on the left side of Danube river. It is located in City of Belgrade.
Before the new road categorization regulation given in 2013, the route wore the following names: M 1.9 (before 2012) / A3 (after 2012).

The existing route is a main road with four traffic lanes, while the Belgrade (printing company) – Krnjača interchange (Pančevo bridge) section has been built by expressway standards. By the valid Space Plan of Republic of Serbia the road is planned for transferring to the new motorway, which would go side-by-side with the State Road 10.

The road is a part of European route E70.

Sections

Planned motorway 
By the valid Space Plan of Republic of Serbia the motorway construction is planned side-by-side with the existing National Road IB-10. The given section would start at Belgrade bypass (which would include Pančevo from the "Pančevo-north" interchange), and end at the border with Romania. The planned highway would go south of existing route until Alibunar, and then north until Vatin, where it would be connected with Romanian road network. By that, the existing section would be shortened.

See also 
 Roads in Serbia

References

External links 
 Official website – Roads of Serbia (Putevi Srbije)
 Official website – Corridors of Serbia (Koridori Srbije) (Serbian)

Expressways in Serbia
State roads in Serbia